General elections were held in Papua New Guinea between 13 June and 4 July 1987. The Pangu Party emerged as the largest party, winning 26 of the 109 seats. Voter turnout was 73.5%.

Results
None of the eighteen female candidates were elected, leading to the first all-male National Parliament in Papua New Guinea's history.

Following the elections, all 22 elected independents joined parties, while two National Party MPs defected; the People's Democratic Movement (PDM) gained nine MPs, the People's Action Party eight, the People's Progress Party (PPP) five, and the Pangu Party and United Party one. The three vacant seats were later won by the National Party, PDM and PPP.

Aftermath
The newly elected Parliament met on 5 August to elect the Prime Minister. Incumbent Prime Minister Paias Wingti defeated former Prime Minister Michael Somare by a vote of 54 to 51. Wingti formed a 25-member cabinet, with Minister of Education Aruru Matiabe also serving as Acting Foreign Minister due to the previous incumbent Ted Diro being accused of corruption during an ongoing inquiry. Diro was instead appointed as a minister without portfolio.

References

External links
Centre on Democratic Performance Election Results Archive

Elections in Papua New Guinea
Papua
1987 in Papua New Guinea
1987 election